"Snoop's Upside Ya Head" is the second European hit and the first single release of Snoop Doggy Dogg's 1996 second album Tha Doggfather. The song heavily samples "I Don't Believe You Want to Get Up and Dance (Oops)" by the Gap Band and features new vocals from Gap Band's lead singer Charlie Wilson. It was released as a single in the UK on September 14, 1996. It was released one day after Death Row Labelmate Tupac Shakur died from injuries sustained in a drive by shooting the week prior.

Music video
In the video an imaginary execution takes place where Snoop Doggy Dogg manages to escape from the electric chair (It refers to the end of Snoop's real life murder trial by verdict of not guilty). After that protesters are outside some with signs stating "we love you Snoop" and others stating "fry 'em". Later Snoop saves a news reporter and drives away in his car and manages to escape the cops briefly. Apparently the news reporter helped Snoop escape as shown briefly in the music video.

Later he performs in an outdoor concert for his awaiting fans and in the progress gets arrested by the cops and is put back in jail. While in jail he performs again for the inmates later showing Snoop in 2021; still an inmate rocking the jail. It stars Vincent Schiavelli as the prison governor, Wilson as the prison guard, and Uncle Junebug as the old Snoop in prison. DJ Pooh makes a cameo appearance as a DJ in the prison.

Track listing 
UK 12" single
Side A
Snoop's Upside Ya Head (Album Version) (featuring Charlie Wilson) — 4:29

Side B
Snoop's Upside Ya Head (Radio Edit) (featuring Charlie Wilson) — 4:29
Snoop's Upside Ya Head (Instrumental) — 4:29

Charts

Certifications

References

1996 singles
Charlie Wilson (singer) songs
Snoop Dogg songs
Songs written by Snoop Dogg
Songs written by Lonnie Simmons
Songs written by Charlie Wilson (singer)
Songs written by Rudy Taylor
Gangsta rap songs
G-funk songs
1996 songs